Radoslav Iliev (Bulgarian: Радослав Илиев; born 2000) is a Bulgarian footballer who plays as a midfielder for Vitosha Bistritsa.

Career

CSKA Sofia
On 31 May 2017 he made his debut for CSKA Sofia in a match against Dunav Ruse.

Career statistics

Club

References

2001 births
Living people
Bulgarian footballers
PFC CSKA Sofia players
Association football midfielders